Salim Medjkoune (born 4 January 1972), is a French former professional boxer who competed from 1992 to 2004. He won the World Boxing Association super bantamweight title in 2002.

Professional career

Medjkoune turned professional in 1992 & amassed a record of 39-3-1 before he fought & beat Japanese boxer Osamu Sato, to win the WBA super bantamweight world title. He defended the title once against Italian boxer Vincenzo Gigliotti, before losing it to Iran's Mahyar Monshipour.

Professional boxing record

See also
List of world super-bantamweight boxing champions

References

External links

 

1972 births
Living people
French male boxers
Sportspeople from Puy-de-Dôme
European Boxing Union champions
World Boxing Association champions
Bantamweight boxers
World super-bantamweight boxing champions